Mihaela Buzărnescu and Justyna Jegiołka were the defending champions, but Jegiołka decided not to participate this year. 

Buzărnescu partnered with Elena Bogdan and successfully defended her title, defeating Bianca Andreescu and Charlotte Robillard-Millette 6–4, 6–7(4–7), [10–6] in the final.

Seeds

Draw

References
Main Draw

Challenger Banque Nationale de Saguenay
Challenger de Saguenay